Nimês Miguel Martins Lopes de Pina (born 4 February 1983 in Guinea-Bissau) is a Bissau-Guinean footballer who is last known to have been dual-registered with AFC Totton and Blackfield & Langley in England.

Career

Moldova

Accepting an offer from Dacia Chisinau of the Moldovan National Division in 2006, Pina claimed that living conditions were poor there and that he had experienced racism there. In view of this, he participated in the 2007 UEFA Intertoto Cup.

Romania

Linked to SCM Râmnicu Vâlcea of the Romanian Liga II in 2008, the Bissau-Guinean was announced in their list for 2008, but was released that December with Slovakian Tomáš Labun.

Malta

Introduced on a short-term contract to Hibernians of the Maltese Premier League in early 2010 through Mawete Júnior, the forward experienced racism as well in Malta, debuting in a 2-4 collapse to Valletta grabbing his first league goal in a 1-0 success over Qormi.

Myanmar

Phoned by an agent of an injured footballer to come to the Myanmar National League with Zwekapin United in 2013, he swapped them for Rakhapura United that April as their second foreigner on a contract that lasted until the end of August before becoming a free agent.

Based on the experience, Pina stated that he was surprised how the people were in Myanmar were very religious and were not condescending about it.

England

First introduced for Tilbury in a 2-2 stalemate with Romford, the attacker made his first start as Tilbury bettered Chatham Town 1–0.

Dually registering for AFC Totton as well as Blackfield & Langley in winter 2017, the frontman found the net on his debut for Totton as the Stags got the better of Barnstaple Town 3–1, producing a goal again from 30 yards out in a 1–0 triumph over Larkhall Athletic. Meanwhile, at Blackfield & Langley, he picked up an injury that December.

References

External links 
 at ZeroZero
 at Soccerway

Bissau-Guinean footballers
Blackfield & Langley F.C. players
SCM Râmnicu Vâlcea players
Association football forwards
1983 births
Expatriate footballers in Cyprus
Expatriate footballers in Myanmar
Expatriate footballers in Romania
Hibernians F.C. players
Maltese Premier League players
Zwegabin United F.C. players
Bissau-Guinean expatriate footballers
A.F.C. Totton players
Othellos Athienou F.C. players
Living people
Expatriate footballers in Moldova
Expatriate footballers in Portugal
Expatriate footballers in England
Expatriate footballers in Malta
FC Dacia Chișinău players
Myanmar National League players
Cypriot Second Division players
Tilbury F.C. players
S.U. Sintrense players